The 2016 New Mexico Stars season was the fourth season for the indoor football franchise, and their first in American Indoor Football (AIF).

On June 16, 2015, the Stars announced that they would be returning to football in 2016, playing the X-League Indoor Football. The team also announced that Carlos Cavanaugh was named the teams' new head coach. However, on October 1, 2015, the X-League folded, and the Stars joined American Indoor Football. On April 3, 2016, John Fourcade was named the head coach of the Stars.

Schedule
Key:

Exhibition
All start times are local to home team

Regular season
All start times are local to home team

Standings

Playoffs
All start times are local to home team

Roster

References

New Mexico Stars
New Mexico Stars
2016 in sports in New Mexico